Eumenidiopsis is an afrotropical genus of Afrotropical potter wasps with eight known species, which are set out below:

 Eumenidiopsis astutus (Kohl, 1906)
 Eumenidiopsis bacilliformis (Giordani Soika, 1940)
 Eumenidiopsis jacoti Giordani Soika, 1977
 Eumenidiopsis mixtus (Giordani Soika, 1943)
 Eumenidiopsis nigritus (Kohl, 1906)
 Eumenidiopsis nitens (Giordani Soika, 1939)
 Eumenidiopsis striativentris (Giordani Soika, 1940)
 Eumenidiopsis subtilis (Giordani Soika, 1939)

References

 Carpenter, J.M., J. Gusenleitner & M. Madl. 2010a. A Catalogue of the Eumeninae (Hymenoptera: Vespidae) of the Ethiopian Region excluding Malagasy Subregion. Part II: Genera Delta de Saussure 1885 to Zethus Fabricius 1804 and species incertae sedis. Linzer Biologischer Beitrage 42 (1): 95-315.

Hymenoptera genera
Potter wasps